9th Reserve Division() was formed in early 1956 in Lanzhou Military Region.

As of its activation the division was composed of:
25th Reserve Regiment;
26th Reserve Regiment;
27th Reserve Regiment;
Artillery Regiment;
Anti-Aircraft Artillery Regiment;
Sergeant Training Regiment.

The division HQ stationed in Zhangye, Gansu, while its subordinated units spread along the Lanzhou–Xinjiang Railway.

The division was fully manned and equipped. During its short-lived existence the division was focused on the training of officers and sergeants.

In March 1957 the division was disbanded.

References

《甘肃省志·军事志》，p.1196-1197

R09
Military units and formations established in 1956
Military units and formations disestablished in 1957
Reserve divisions of the People's Liberation Army